Scillaelepas falcata (also called Aurivillialepas falcata) is a species of barnacle that is a member of the Calanticidae family. Its habitat includes the seafloor as well as seashores, littoral, coral reefs, and the deep seabed.

References 

Barnacles